This article is a list of historic places in the territory of Yukon entered on the Canadian Register of Historic Places, whether they are federal, provincial, or municipal.

List of historic places

See also 

 List of National Historic Sites of Canada in Yukon

Yukon
Yukon